The "Nepal Scouts" ("नेपाल स्काउट") is the national Scouting and Guiding organization of Nepal, founded in Nepal in 1952. It became a member of the World Organization of the Scout Movement in 1969 and later became a member of the World Association of Girl Guides and Girl Scouts in 1984.

The organization serves 19,952 Scouts (as of 2011) and 11,962 Guides (as of 2003).

History
In 2007, as part of the centenary of Scouting, Nepal renamed Urkema Peak in the Himalayas to Baden-Powell Peak.

In 2016 the Nepal Scout Flag was taken to the top of Mount Everest for the first time by Anish Luitel, the first scout from Nepal to summit Everest.

Program
Programs focus on handicrafts, hiking, camping, nature conservation and community development. Service activities include adult literacy campaigns, food production, child vaccination and drug abuse education. Relief operations are mobilized during earthquakes, floods, landslides, fires and other natural disasters.

Activities
Scout activities are organized for both boys and girls jointly; but training, camping and other aspects of the program are conducted separately.

Under the national education system, university students pursuing the master's level are required to serve in a village for a year. These students are given an orientation that includes Scout training.

National jamborees
The first national jamboree of the Nepal Scouts was organized in 1987 at Kirtipur. 

The second national jamboree was organized in 2013 at Tikauli of Chitwan District (after almost 26 years) and was themed Peace and Harmony..

The Third National Scout Jamboree was held on May 30 to 4 June, 2018 at Kakani International Scouts Center, Nuwakot.

Training centres

The Nepal Scouts has its National Training Center at Sundarijal, Kathmandu. The International training center is situated at Kakani, Nuwakot District.

Rovers/Ranger: Ages 16 to 25

Scout Mottoes
Cubs: सक्दो कोशिस गर Sakdo Kosis Gara (Do Your Best)
Scouts: तयार होऊ Tayar Hou (Be Prepared)
Rovers: सेवा Sewa (Service)

Emblem

The membership badge of the Nepal Scouts incorporates elements of the flag of Nepal, and both the trefoil to represent the girls and the fleur-de-lis to represent the boys, as well as the founding date in both Western and Nepali calendars. 

The highest rank in scout level is 'King's Badge" however, after revolution it is now the Everest Badge.

International Scouting units in Nepal

Nepal has active expatriate Scout groups, including the American Boy Scouts in Kathmandu, the Direct Service Pack, and Troop 900. These are sponsored by the Lincoln School and linked to the Direct Service branch of the Boy Scouts of America, which supports units around the world.

References

Child-related organisations in Nepal
World Association of Girl Guides and Girl Scouts member organizations
World Organization of the Scout Movement member organizations
Scouting in Nepal
Youth organizations established in 1952
1952 establishments in Nepal